Ron Dupree is a former American football coach.  Dupree was the 15th head football coach at Kansas Wesleyan University in Salina, Kansas, serving for three seasons, from 1979 to 1980 and again in 1996.  His coaching record at Kansas Wesleyan was 11–18.

Head coaching record

References

Year of birth missing (living people)
Living people
Kansas Wesleyan Coyotes football coaches